Redstocks is a hamlet in Wiltshire, England; it is in the civil parish of Melksham Without and is  east of Melksham.

From 1886 to 1950 there was a small Wesleyan Methodist chapel.

References

External links

Melksham Without
Hamlets in Wiltshire